Aeroméxico Flight 498 was a scheduled commercial flight from Mexico City, Mexico to Los Angeles, California, United States, with several intermediate stops. On Sunday, August 31, 1986, the McDonnell Douglas DC-9 operating the flight was clipped in the tail section by N4891F, a Piper PA-28-181 Cherokee owned by the Kramer family, and crashed into the Los Angeles suburb of Cerritos, killing all 64 on the DC-9, all three on the Piper and an additional 15 on the ground. Eight on the ground also sustained minor injuries. Blame was assessed equally on the Federal Aviation Administration (FAA) and the pilot of the Cherokee. No fault was found with the DC-9 or the actions of its crew.

Aircraft
The larger aircraft involved, a McDonnell Douglas DC-9-32 with tail number XA-JED named Hermosillo, was delivered in April 1969 to Delta Air Lines as N1277L before entering into service with Aeroméxico in November 1979. It was flying from Mexico City to Los Angeles International Airport (LAX), with intermediate stops in Guadalajara, Loreto and Tijuana.

N4891F was a privately operated Piper PA-28-181 Archer owned by the Kramer family, which was flying from Torrance to Big Bear City, California. The Piper aircraft was piloted by William Kramer, 53. His wife Kathleen, 51, and daughter Caroline, 26, were also aboard. Their plane had departed Torrance at approximately  Kramer had 231 flight hours of experience and had moved to Southern California within the last year from Spokane, Washington.

The cockpit crew of Flight 498 consisted of Captain Arturo Valdes Prom (46) and First Officer Jose Hector Valencia (26). The captain had 4,632 hours of flying experience in the DC-9 and a total of 10,641 flight hours. The first officer had flown 1,463 hours, of which 1,245 hours had been accumulated in the DC-9.

Accident summary
On Sunday, August 31, 1986, at approximately 11:46 a.m. PDT, Flight 498 began its descent into Los Angeles with 58 passengers and six crew members on board. At 11:52 a.m., the Piper's engine collided with the left horizontal stabilizer of the DC-9, shearing off the top of the Piper's cockpit and decapitating Kramer and both of his passengers. The heavily damaged Piper fell onto an empty playground at 

The DC-9, with all of its horizontal stabilizer and most of its vertical stabilizer separated, inverted and immediately entered a dive. It slammed into a residential neighborhood at Holmes Avenue and Reva Circle in Cerritos, crashing into the backyard of a house at 13426 Ashworth Place, where it exploded on impact. The explosion scattered the DC-9's wreckage across Holmes Avenue and onto Carmenita Road, destroying four other houses and damaging seven more. All 64 passengers and crew on board the DC-9 and 15 people on the ground were killed, and a fire added to the damage.

Passengers and crew

Thirty-six of the passengers were citizens of the United States. Of the 20 Mexican citizens, 11 lived in the U.S. and nine lived in Mexico. One Salvadoran citizen lived in Islip, New York. Ten of the passengers were children.

Investigation and aftermath

The U.S. National Transportation Safety Board (NTSB) investigation found that the Piper had entered the Los Angeles Terminal Control Area (TCA) airspace without the required clearance. The Piper could legally fly beneath this airspace without contacting air traffic control (ATC), but instead climbed into the TCA. The ATC had been distracted by another unauthorized private flight, a Grumman AA-5B Tiger, entering the TCA directly north of the airfield, which also did not have clearance.

The Piper was not equipped with a Mode C transponder, nor was one required, which would have indicated its altitude, and LAX was not equipped with automatic warning systems. Neither pilot appeared to have attempted any evasive maneuvers because neither pilot sighted the other aircraft, although they were in visual range. When an autopsy revealed significant arterial blockage in Kramer's heart, public speculation arose suggesting that he had experienced a heart attack that incapacitated him and led to the collision, but further forensic evidence discounted the theory and Kramer's error was determined to be the main contributing factor to the collision.

As a result of this accident and other near midair collisions in terminal control areas, the FAA required that all jets in U.S. airspace be equipped with a traffic collision avoidance system (TCAS) and required that light aircraft operating in dense airspaces be equipped with Mode C transponders, which can report their altitude.

A jury ruled that the DC-9 bore no fault, instead deciding that Kramer and the FAA each acted equally negligently and bore equal responsibility. Federal Air Regulations 14 CFR 91.113 (b) require pilots of all aircraft to maintain vigilance to "see and avoid" other aircraft that might be on conflicting flight paths.

The United States Court of Appeals for the Ninth Circuit applied the Supreme Court of California's ruling in Thing v. La Chusa to extend recovery for negligent infliction of emotional distress to Theresa Estrada, whose husband and two of four children were killed in the crash on the ground. In the television documentary Mayday, Estrada reported that she saw the explosion from a distance; Thing requires that the person be at the scene and aware of the injury being caused to the victim. She arrived minutes later with her home consumed by fire and surrounded by burning homes, cars and aircraft debris. In a separate trial on damages, the Estrada family was awarded a total of $868,263 in economic damages and $4.7 million in noneconomic damages, including $1 million for the negligent infliction of emotional distress.

Flight number 498 was put back into service as a flight from Mexico City International Airport to McCarran International Airport via Monterrey International Airport, using an Embraer 190 operated by Aeroméxico's subsidiary Aeroméxico Connect. As of February 2018, flight number 498 is no longer used. Aeroméxico still continues fly to Los Angeles, but now today as Flight 646, using a Boeing 737 Next Generation or Boeing 787 Dreamliner.

In popular culture
The Discovery Channel Canada/National Geographic television series Mayday featured the accident in a Season 4 episode titled "Out of Sight". The accident was featured again during Season 8 in a compilation episode titled "System Breakdown".

A similar accident is depicted in the Breaking Bad episode "ABQ". The show's main character has the same name as the air-traffic controller in the real-life accident, Walter White.

It is featured in season 1, episode 5, of the TV show Why Planes Crash, in an episode called "Collision Course".

In August 2022, KNBC produced The Nightmare of Flight 498, led by reporter Hetty Chang, who had been a 7-year-old child residing in the neighborhood where the DC-9 crashed and a student at the school where the Piper Cherokee crashed.  Interspersed with news reports from the crash, Chang interviewed her parents, neighbors (including one who resided at 13426 Ashworth Place where the DC-9 exploded), and first responders about their recollections of the crash.

Memorial

On March 11, 2006, the city of Cerritos dedicated a new sculpture garden featuring a memorial to the victims of the accident. The sculpture, designed by Kathleen Caricof, consists of three pieces. One piece resembling a wing commemorates the victims aboard the Aeroméxico jet and the Piper. A similar but smaller and darker wing commemorates the victims who were killed on the ground. Each wing rests on a pedestal that lists victims in alphabetical order. A bench for reflection is situated in front of the two wings.

Gallery

See also

 TWA Flight 553, a similar crash that occurred in 1967 near Urbana, Ohio and involved a new DC-9 and a small plane.
 Piedmont Airlines Flight 22, a similar crash that occurred with a 727 in Hendersonville, North Carolina in 1967.
 Allegheny Airlines Flight 853, a similar crash that occurred also with a DC-9 and Piper Cherokee in Fairland, Indiana in 1969.
 Pacific Southwest Airlines Flight 182, a similar midair collision between a Boeing 727 and a Cessna 172 in San Diego, California in 1978.
 Proteus Airlines Flight 706, a similar midair collision between a Beechcraft 1900 and a Cessna 177 Cardinal over Quiberon Bay, Brittany, France in 1998.
 Hughes Airwest Flight 706, a midair collision over Los Angeles on June 6, 1971, when a DC-9 was hit by a fighter jet. Multiple factors contributing to the collision included the fighter aircrew's forced decision to fly in a high-speed jet with oxygen issues, slow reaction by the fighter because of a lack of oxygen, poor communication between civilian controllers with military flights, the fighter aircrew's lack of awareness of air routes out of LAX and the inability of the DC-9 crew to see the fighter jet because of its speed, window posts that created blind spots and the fighter jet's position relative to the DC-9 as it was coming from the DC-9's far left side.

References

External links

 NTSB.gov, Brief of Accident, NTSB, adopted March 7, 1988
 AOPA.org, Collision Over Cerritos, Aircraft Owners and Pilots Association
 "California Jet Crash Led to Sweeping Changes". The New York Times
 Story Of Cerritos – Chapter 8 (Aeroméxico Flight 498)
 DC 9 Crashes in Cerritos Residential Area. (Archive)
 Landmark Accidents: Collision Over Cerritos
 Out of Sight – Aeromexico Flight 498
  at airdisaster.com
 Pre-crash photo of the airliner at airliners.net
 
 Microfiche Details at AirFlightDisaster
 NTSB Safety Recommendation Letter (Alternate)

1986 in California
Accidents and incidents involving the McDonnell Douglas DC-9
Aeroméxico accidents and incidents
Airliner accidents and incidents caused by pilot error
Airliner accidents and incidents in California
August 1986 events in the United States
Aviation accidents and incidents caused by air traffic controller error
Aviation accidents and incidents in California
Aviation accidents and incidents in the United States in 1986
Cerritos, California
Disasters in California
Mid-air collisions involving airliners
Mid-air collisions involving general aviation aircraft
Mid-air collisions